Balagam is a 2023 Telugu-language family drama film directed by Venu Yeldandi in his directorial debut. The film is produced by Harshith Reddy, Hanshitha Reddy under the banner Dil Raju Productions, and features Priyadarshi, Kavya Kalyanram, Sudhakar Reddy, Muraleedhar Goud in pivotal roles. The film was released on March 3, 2023.

Cast 

 Priyadarshi as Sayilu
 Kavya Kalyan Ram as Sandhya
 Sudhakar Reddy as Sayilu's grandfather
 Jayaram as Sayilu's father
 Muralidhar Goud as Narayana
 Vijayalakshmi
 Krishna Teja as RMP doctor
 Swarupa as Sayilu's mother
 Mogili as Sayilu's uncle 
 Mime Madhu
 Racha Ravi
 Vidyasagar Karampuri

Soundtrack
The soundtrack album is composed by Bheems Ceciroleo, with lyrics written by Kasarla Shyam. Aditya Music released the complete soundtrack album featuring three tracks.

The first song of the film "Ooru Palletooru" was released on 6 February 2023.

Marketing 
The pre-release ceremony of this movie was held on February 28, 2023, at Bathukamma Ghat in Sirisilla town. Telangana Government IT and Industries Minister KTR was the chief guest in this ceremony.

Release 
Balagam was released on 3 March 2023.

Reception

Critical response 
123Telugu gave 3 out of 5 stars and wrote "Balagam is a genuine attempt to explore human values and emotions that is devoid of any commercial ingredients. The film’s trump cards are the natural village atmosphere, heartwarming performances, and gratifying emotional sequences. As mentioned earlier, the film might not sit well with a section of the audience. Barring the slightly slow first half, this film can be watched on big screens this weekend."

References

External links 
 

2020s Telugu-language films